The Emanuel Building, also known as the Bank of Mobile and Staples-Pake Building is a historic commercial building in Mobile, Alabama, United States. The three-story masonry structure was built in 1850 and then remodeled several times over the next century.  It was placed on the National Register of Historic Places on March 21, 1978.

References

National Register of Historic Places in Mobile, Alabama
Buildings and structures in Mobile, Alabama
Federal architecture in Alabama
Commercial buildings completed in 1850
Renaissance Revival architecture in Alabama
Commercial buildings on the National Register of Historic Places in Alabama